Sergio Di Giulio (4 April 1945 – 24 July 2019) was an Italian actor and voice actor.

Biography
Di Giulio studied at the Alessandro Fersen drama school. In 1968 he made his theater debut with L'estasi e il sangue, directed by Andrea Camilleri. Later, for three years, he attended the Stabile Theatre in Rome.

Di Giulio was notable for dubbing the voices of Timmy's father in the animated show The Fairly Oddparents, Dan Aykroyd in Ghostbusters and Jim Belushi in Red Heat. He also served as an actor in the movie One Hamlet Less.

References

External links

1945 births
2019 deaths
Italian male voice actors
Italian male television actors
Italian male film actors
Italian male stage actors
Italian voice directors
Male actors from Milan